Sri Ramakrishna Hospital is a 1000-bedded multi-specialty hospital located in Coimbatore, Tamil Nadu. The hospital was started in 1975. Sri Ramakrishna Hospital was established and is run by the SNR Sons Trust that was founded in the year 1970 by Mr. R. Doraiswamy Naidu (RD) and Sevaratna Dr. R. Venkatesalu, sons of Sri. S.N. Rangasamy Naidu. The trust successfully runs 15 organizations that caters to the social causes of society primarily focusing on Health Care, Education and Service.

Sevaratna Dr. R. Venkatesalu (RV) and Mr. R. Doraiswamy Naidu (RD) single handedly established the Ramakrishna group and the SNR and sons trust on the land owned by his family. RV's wife late Mrs. Velumani ammal, daughter of PSG Ganga Naidu, played a pivotal role is creation of the trust.

This hospital is accredited by NABH (National Accreditation Board for Hospitals & Healthcare Providers). The hospital was among the pioneers of cardiology, cancer treatment, IVF, kidney transplantation, neurology among others in the Kongu Region performing these procedures for the first time in Tamil Nadu.

The hospital has also won the Guinness World Record for signing up 13,000 people as organ donors in eight hours.

Facilities 
The original hospital has 1000 beds with trained staff offering advanced treatments and procedures ranging from advanced neurosurgery to chemotherapy to stem cell transplantation to organ transplants.

At the 230-bed super-specialty block.

Online consultation 
Sri Ramakrishna Hospital has online doctor consultations with all the doctors, it enabled people to connect with the doctors during COVID-19. A range of doctors from various major and minor departments are available online to answer the patient's health concerns.

Laboratory services 
Sri Ramakrishna Hospital is equipped with all diagnostic equipment for various departments including clinical pathology, clinical biochemistry and endocrinology, microbiology, and much more. The hospital has installed the "RevolutionTM CT" scan machine(the first of its kind in Asia).

The laboratory facilities are also used to facilitate and enhance the many teaching programs conducted by the hospital.

Awards and recognition 
Guinness World Record Award - Guinness World Record for Most People to Sign up as Organ Donor in 8 hours.

See also 
Sri Ramakrishna Engineering College
Sri Ramakrishna College of Arts and Science 
List of Hospitals in India
Mirudhubashini Govindarajan
Avarampalayam

References

External links 
 Sri Ramakrishna Hospital, Coimbatore, Official Website
 Sri Ramakrishna Engineering College, Coimbatore, Official Website
 SNR Sons Charitable Trust, Coimbatore, Official Website

Hospitals in Tamil Nadu
Coimbatore
Private hospitals in India
Hospitals established in 1975
1975 establishments in Tamil Nadu